The 1931–32 Michigan Wolverines men's basketball team represented the University of Michigan in intercollegiate basketball during the 1931–32 season.  The team compiled an 11–6 record and 8–4 against Big Ten Conference opponents.  The team finished in fourth place in the Big Ten.

Franklin Cappon was in his first year as the team's head coach.  Norman Daniels was the team captain and the team's leading scorer with 148 points in 17 games for an average of 8.7 points per game.

Scoring statistics

References

Michigan
Michigan Wolverines men's basketball seasons
Michigan Wolverines basketball
Michigan Wolverines basketball